Élber (born 1972), Élber de Souza, is a retired Brazilian football striker

Elber may also refer to:

Elber Binha (born 1991), Jorge Mota Faial Delgado, Cape Verdean football goalkeeper
Élber (footballer, born 1992), José Élber Pimentel da Silva, Brazilian football forward for Yokohama F. Marinos
Elber Evora (born 1999), Cape Verdean football goalkeeper
Elber (grapes), synonym for Elbling, a variety of white grapes

See also
Elbers, surname
Elbe (disambiguation)